The Mikoyan-Gurevich MiG-110 was a proposed Russian passenger/cargo aircraft that began development in 1995 but was not built. It would have been a high-mounted cantilever monoplane with a pod-and-boom configuration with a beavertail rear fuselage, to be powered by two Klimov TV7-117 turboprop engines.

Proposed variants
 MiG-110N – dedicated passenger version
 MiG-110NP – paramilitary version
 MiG-110M – combination passenger/freight version with all-weather and STOL capability
 MiG-110A – version for joint project, for production in Austria.

Specifications (MiG-110M)

See also 

 List of civil aircraft
 Mikoyan-Gurevich

Mig-110
Proposed aircraft of Russia